The Institut Laue–Langevin (ILL) is an internationally financed scientific facility, situated on the Polygone Scientifique in Grenoble, France. It is one of the world centres for research using neutrons. Founded in 1967 and honouring the physicists Max von Laue and Paul Langevin, the ILL provides one of the most intense neutron sources in the world and the most intense continuous neutron flux in the world in the moderator region: 1.5×1015 neutrons per second per cm2, with a thermal power of typically 58.3 MW.

The ILL neutron scattering facilities allow the analysis of the structure of conducting and magnetic materials for future electronic devices, the measurement of stresses in mechanical materials.  It also allows investigations into macromolecular assemblies, particularly protein dynamics and biomolecular structure. It is a world-renowned centre for nanoscale science.

History 

The institute was founded by France and Germany, with the United Kingdom becoming the third major partner in 1973. These partner states provide, through Research Councils, the bulk of its funding. Ten other countries have since become partners. Scientists of institutions in the member states may apply to use the ILL facilities, and may invite scientists from other countries to participate. Experimental time is allocated by a scientific council involving ILL users. The use of the facility and travel costs for researchers are paid for by the institute. Commercial use, for which a fee is charged, is not subject to the scientific council review process. Over 750 experiments are completed every year, in fields including magnetism, superconductivity, materials engineering, and the study of liquids, colloids and biological substances such as proteins. 

The high-flux research reactor produces neutrons through fission in a compact-core fuel element.  Neutron moderators cool the neutrons to wavelengths usable experimentally. Neutrons are then directed at a suite of instruments to probe the structure and behaviour of many forms of matter by elastic and inelastic neutron scattering, and to probe the fundamental physical properties of the neutron.   Fission products and gamma rays produced by nuclear reactions in the reactor core are also used by the instrument suite.

In 2000 began the introduction of new instruments and instrument upgrades. The first phase has already resulted in a 17-fold gains in performance. The second phase started in 2008: it comprises the building of 5 new instruments, the upgrade of 4 others, and the installation of 3 new neutron guides.

EPN Science Campus 

The ILL shares its site, the 'epn science campus', with other institutions including the European Synchrotron Radiation Facility (ESRF) and the European Molecular Biology Laboratory (EMBL) and the Unit for Viral Host Cell Interactions (UVHCI). The French  Institut de Biologie Structural (IBS) joined the campus in 2013.

Participants 
The ILL is governed by its Associates.

Applications research 

In 2019, researchers unravelled information about a protein causing progressive diseases. 

In summer 2016 the Institut Laue–Langevin demonstrated that a molecule called ectoine is used by Halomonas titanicae near the wreck of RMS Titanic to survive the osmotic pressure that salt water causes on their membranes.

Awards and recognitions 
The physicist Duncan Haldane who worked at the institute from 1977 to 1981 received the Nobel Prize in Physics in 2016 with Michael Kosterlitz and David J. Thouless for their work on the transitions of topological phases in the material.

Rudolf Mossbauer, Nobel Prize in Physics in 1961, succeeded Heinz Maier-Leibnitz in 1972 as the director of the institute.

The physicist Philippe Nozieres, who worked at the institute from 1972 until his retirement, received the Wolf Prize in 1985, together with Conyers Herring, for their major contributions to the fundamental theory of solids, especially the behaviour of electrons in metals.

Techniques 
Neutron diffraction
Small angle neutron scattering
Neutron reflectometry
Inelastic neutron scattering
Neutron triple-axis spectrometry
Neutron time-of-flight scattering
Neutron backscattering
Neutron spin echo

See also
 Inorganic Crystal Structure Database (ICSD)

References

Sources
The 2017 ILL annual report
Le Journal du CNRS, printemps 2019: Ces laboratoires qui illuminent l'Europe
medicalxpress.com Alzheimer's disease markers could be identified through protein water mobility

External links

 Institut Laue-Langevin
 ILL general presentation film

Neutron facilities
Physics institutes
Research institutes in France
Science and technology in Grenoble